Großkarolinenfeld (spelled with the German ß) is a municipality in the district of Rosenheim in Bavaria in Germany.

It is located at the Munich–Rosenheim railway. The Großkarolinenfeld station is served about once per hour by local trains of the company Meridian.

There are 41 official boroughs of Großkarolinenfeld. The larger ones are Großkarolinenfeld itself, Jarezöd (also known as Dred), Hilperting, Tattenhausen and Thann, the smaller ones are mostly farmsteads, namely Alsterloh, Ametsbichl, Aschach, Auberg, Bach, Bichl, Buchrain, Deutlstätt, Ester, Filzen, Frauenholz, Gröben, Gutmart, Haslau, Hohenaich, Hub, Kirchsteig, Kolberg, Krabichl, Lehen, Linden, Mühlbach, Naglstätt, Öd, Ödenhub, Petzenbichl, Rann, Ried, Riedhof, Rott, Schlimmerstätt, Schwaig, Stolz, Thonbichl, Vogl, and Zweckstätt.

Three rivers are located in the borough of Großkarolinenfeld: The Aschach and the Erlbach discharge into the Rott.

History

In 1802, the Catholic Maximilian I Joseph of Bavaria and his Protestant wife Caroline of Baden decreed that people from the Electoral Palatinate may settle down in some places at the Old Bavarian Donaumoos. One of these places was the new municipality of Großkarolinenfeld.
In 1882, the first Protestant church in Altbayern war erected here.

References

Rosenheim (district)